Batik Tribe is a hip hop band that started at the beginning of 2007. Batik Tribe is composed of Della MC (havis), who helps for the shout, while Saykoji raps, Cool B (budi) is a dancer who often accompany some Indonesian celebrities, Wizzow (Wisnu) is a reliable music producer in Indonesia, and DJ S-tea (sonu) who has experience and who also created a hip hop band in Australia.

When Batik Tribe released its first album "melangkah" in 2008, members of the band agreed to produce it and distribute only  CD's and  cassettes, using the services of record label medium (Virgo Ramayana Record).

Surviving the music industry in Indonesia has become a struggle for Batik Tribe.

The first single from their album "Melangkah" titled "Sabarlah"(Be patient) is dedicated to the children who live on the street.

Discography

Album 
 2008 : Melangkah through Virgo Ramayana Records
 2010 : Currently recording the album

External links 
  Batik Tribe Bust Out Indonesian Rhymes - The Jakarta Globe
  Junk - idBatik Tribe - Melangkah
  KapanLagi.com - Batik Tribe, Bermusik Untuk Anak Jalanan
  Hiphopindo.net: Batik Tribe – Buah Album dari Perjalanan Panjang
  Indonesiantunes.com
  Antara.co.id

Indonesian musical groups
Hip hop groups